Mee's Bus Lines is a bus and coach operator in Melbourne, Australia.

History
Russell Mee commenced a body builder business in 1941. Initially trading as Mee's Bodyworks banner and later Melba Busworks, it built bodies for many operators as well as the Australian Army.

A route from Canterbury to Box Hill South was purchased route from L Drumgold in 1965, however ceased in 1967. In June 1972 Mee's commenced operating some routes around Warrandyte. These were sold in 1973 to Hurstbridge Bus & Taxi Service 1973.

It now operates an extensive school run and charter business, as well as a coach service from Melbourne to Mansfield under a contract with V/Line service.

Fleet
As at January 2023, the fleet consists of 117 buses and coaches. The fleet livery is cream, brown and orange.

References

External links

Bus companies of Victoria (Australia)
Bus manufacturers of Australia
Bus transport in Melbourne
Vehicle manufacturing companies established in 1941
Vehicle manufacturing companies established in 1987
1941 establishments in Australia
Companies based in Melbourne